The Henschel Hs 294 was a guided air-to-sea missile developed by Henschel Flugzeug-Werke AG in Germany during World War II.

Design

The Hs 294 was a further development of the Henschel Hs 293, but was of an elongated, more streamlined shape. When launched from an aircraft, it was guided to its target with the same Kehl-Straßburg remote control system as both the Hs 293 and unpowered Fritz X armored precision-guided munition systems used for their MCLOS guidance needs. Just before it reached its target, it was guided into the water whereupon its wings would break off and then it then would run like a torpedo, propelled by its remaining kinetic energy; it would explode below the waterline of the vessel. The proximity fuze was that of a regular German torpedo.

See also 
 List of German guided weapons of World War II
 Ruhrstahl X-4 - Max Kramer's air-to-air guided missile
 Yokosuka MXY-7 Ohka
 Project Pigeon
 LBD-1 Gargoyle
 GB-1
 GB-4
 GT-1 (missile)

References

World War II guided missiles of Germany
Guided bombs
Anti-ship missiles of Germany